Charles Robert Alexander (8 November 1847 – 17 February 1902) was an English barrister, stockbroker and amateur cricketer.

Early life
Alexander was the son of James and Anna Alexander and was born at Westminster in London in 1847. His father was a banker and East India Agent and Alexander grew up at the family home Oak Bank at Seal near Sevenoaks, Kent.

After attending Eton College, where he captained the school cricket XI in his final year, Alexander went up to King's College, Cambridge in 1867. He studied Law and was admitted to the Middle Temple in 1868 before graduating in 1871.

Cricket
A right-handed batsman, Alexander made his first-class cricket debut for Kent County Cricket Club against the Gentlemen of MCC in 1867, the summer after he left school. Alexander appeared three further times for Kent, playing his final first-class match for the county in 1869 against Sussex. At Cambridge he played for the University Cricket Club against Surrey at The Oval in 1870 and against MCC in 1871. Whilst at University he played cricket regularly, including for amateur sides such as Perambulators, Quidnuncs and Harlequins as well as for MCC.

Professional and later life
Alexander moved from the Middle Temple to Lincoln's Inn in 1873 before he was called to the bar in 1874. He later became a member of the London Stock Exchange.

Alexander married Mary Evans; the couple had no children. He died in February 1902 at Westminster aged 54 leaving an estate worth over £17,000.

References

External links

1847 births
1902 deaths
People from Westminster
Cricketers from Greater London
People educated at Eton College
Alumni of King's College, Cambridge
English cricketers
Kent cricketers
Cambridge University cricketers
Members of Lincoln's Inn
19th-century English lawyers
People from Seal, Kent
English barristers